Sage Surratt (born April 13, 1998) is an American football tight end for the New Orleans Breakers of the United States Football League (USFL). He was signed by the Detroit Lions as an undrafted free agent after not being selected in the 2021 NFL Draft, and was on their practice squad for 2021. He played college football at Wake Forest.

Early life and high school
Surratt grew up in Lincolnton, North Carolina, and attended East Lincoln High School before transferring to Lincolnton High School his senior year, where he played football and basketball and was an All-Conference selection in each of his four seasons in both sports. In football, he set state records for reception (366), yards (5,926) and touchdown receptions (80). In basketball, Surratt finished as the second-leading scorer in North Carolina history with 2,951 points.

College career
Surratt redshirted his true freshman season. As a redshirt freshman, Surratt was the Demon Deacons second leading receiver with 41 receptions for 581 yards and four touchdowns. He started the first game of his collegiate career and was named the Atlantic Coast Conference Rookie of the Week after catching 11 passes for 150 yards against Tulane.

Surratt was named the Fred Biletnikoff Award watchlist four weeks into his redshirt sophomore season. He was named the ACC Receiver of the Week in four out of the first eight weeks of the season and was the first player from a Power Five conference to accumulate 1,000 receiving yards. Surratt suffered a season-ending shoulder injury on November 9, 2019 against Virginia Tech. He finished the season with 1,001 yards on 66 receptions with 11 touchdowns. Despite only playing in nine games, Surratt was named a semifinalist for the Biletnikoff Award and first team All-ACC. After considering entering the 2020 NFL draft, Surratt announced that he would return to Wake Forest for his redshirt junior season. However, before the start of the 2020 season, Surratt opted out for the season.

Professional career
Surratt ran a 40-yard dash in 4.7 seconds.

Surratt signed with the Detroit Lions as an undrafted free agent on May 3, 2021. He was waived on August 31, 2021 and re-signed to the practice squad the next day. He was released on September 15, 2021.

Birmingham Stallions
On March 10, 2022, Surratt was drafted by the Birmingham Stallions of the United States Football League. He was transferred to the team's practice squad on April 14, 2022, and remained on the inactive roster on April 22. He was moved to the active roster on May 6, and to the inactive roster again on May 14 with a hip flexor. He was moved back to the active roster on May 20.

Los Angeles Chargers
On July 31, 2022, Surratt signed with the Los Angeles Chargers. He was waived with an injury settlement on August 30, 2022.

New Orleans Breakers
On February 15, 2023, Surratt signed with the New Orleans Breakers of the United States Football League (USFL).

Personal life
Surratt's older brother, Chazz Surratt, played linebacker at North Carolina, and was drafted by the Minnesota Vikings in the 2021 NFL Draft.

References

External links
Wake Forest Demon Deacons bio

1998 births
Living people
American football wide receivers
People from Lincolnton, North Carolina
Players of American football from North Carolina
Wake Forest Demon Deacons football players
Detroit Lions players
Birmingham Stallions (2022) players
Los Angeles Chargers players
New Orleans Breakers (2022) players